Mupperum Deviyar is a 1987 Indian Tamil-language film,  directed by K. Shankar and produced by M. Sarojini Devi. The film stars K. R. Vijaya, Sujatha and Lakshmi. It was released on 12 November 1987.

Plot
Sivan, Bramma and Vishnu meet and discuss which of the three are more highly regarded among humans. Their wives are pulled into this discussion and each feels that her respective husband is most highly regarded among the people. All three agree that without them, their husbands wouldn't be able to function. The three gods challenge their wives to spend time on Earth without the benefit of their powers. Saraswathy goes in aid of a poet that must compete against an arrogant man. Lakshmi goes to the home of a devout family that faces many problems. Parvathy must raise the orphaned true prince of a kingdom and restore him to the throne against all odds. All of the gods learn to appreciate each other's importance and work together to stop a large threat.

Cast

K. R. Vijaya as Goddess Parvathy
Lakshmi as Goddess Lakshmi 
Sujatha as Goddess Saraswathy 
Prabhu as Sudarshanan
Ambika 
M. N. Nambiar
Delhi Ganesh
Sangili Murugan
Senthil
Jai Ganesh
Vennira Aadai Moorthy
Oru Viral Krishna Rao
LIC Narasimhan as Sivan
Heran Ramasamy
Sangili Murugan
Kokila
Master Sridhar
Srikanth

Soundtrack
The music was composed by M. S. Viswanathan.

References

External links
 

1980 films
1980s Tamil-language films
Films scored by M. S. Viswanathan
Films directed by K. Shankar